The Old Footlight Favorite (literally "Too Old!") was a 1908 French short silent film by Georges Méliès.

Plot
An elderly actor, once an audience favorite, goes to a talent agency for work, but is told he is too old to be hired. Going home, he tells the bad news to his wife. They pawn most of their possessions, and end up begging on the streets. There they happen to come across a familiar face: a star performer, who rose to fame after getting valuable advice from the older actor. The star, finding his mentor impoverished, offers his home as a place to live.

Release
The film was sold by Méliès's Star Film Company and is numbered 1329–1336 in its catalogues. It is currently presumed lost.

References

External links
 

French black-and-white films
Films directed by Georges Méliès
French silent short films
Lost French films